Tilikanagar is an urban area of Rourkela Steel City, in Sundargarh District of Odisha, India. The place is located at a distance of only 3.75 km away from the main city and in the junction of Rourkela and Bondamunda.

 Nearest railway station: Rourkela (ROU)
 Nearest airport: Jharsuguda (JRG)
 Nearest hospital: Tilkanagar Health Center

Although residents here belong to different parts of the world they are mainly Uttar Pradesh and Bihar people. Apart from this, S.T. and S.C. peoples are also contributing in its population.

Colony was set up during 1984 by steel plant management for people who were stranded in plant area where current plant is situated. Each family was given a 15' X 30'-size plot and well connected with drains and road. Although it is not a registered land, people having money have started building Pakka house from last 3-4 years and it is in pick nowadays and almost all people are constructing pakka house in a view of current demand to convert this land to a registered land. There are numbers of protest at municipality and demand continued. If this place not converted to registered land there will affect almost 1000 families.

Tilikanagar is well connected with local transportation to Rourkela and also good road conditions so people do like to keep their livelihood here. Many people have already purchased registered land in Rourkela, Kuarmunda, Jamuna dhipa, Vedvyas but still they like to stay here due to better connectivity and planned colony setup by RSP.

Rourkela